Ramona Gilmour-Darling is a Canadian actress, singer, and dancer.  In 2006, she began portraying Loonette the Clown (taking over for Alyson Court, who played the original Loonette from Seasons 1-6) on the Canadian children's television series The Big Comfy Couch for the seventh and final season, which aired in Canada on Treehouse and on various PBS stations in the United States. She has also appeared on stage in leading roles in many plays and musicals in Canada, most notably as Mary in The Secret Garden (Young People's Theatre, 2001) in Toronto, Anne in Anne of Green Gables (2005) and Polly Peachum in The Beggar's Opera (2006), Eponine in Les Misérables and Kitty in The Drowsy Chaperone at the Thousand Islands Playhouse. She appeared as a group member in an Season 4, Episode 7 of Piper Perabo's television series Covert Affairs.

References

External links

Canadian television actresses
Canadian musical theatre actresses
Canadian stage actresses
Living people
1975 births